Kassina jozani is a species of frogs in the family Hyperoliidae. It is endemic to  Tanzania and only known from the Jozani Forest on the Unguja Island (Zanzibar).

Description
It is a medium-sized frog (males measure about 4 cm). The back is covered with splashes of color from black to dark gray, separated by light gray, thin lines with a light creamy white belly. Its eyes are large and protruding, and the ends of its fingers and extremely flattened.

Habitat

References

jozani
Endemic fauna of Tanzania
Amphibians of Tanzania
Frogs of Africa
Amphibians described in 2007